June Cotner (born February 6, 1950 in Chicago, Illinois) is an American author, anthologist, speaker, and publishing/marketing consultant; her latest anthology is Gratitude Prayers: Prayers, Poems, and Prose for Everyday Thankfulness (Andrews McMeel Publishing).

Cotner's collected works have sold nearly one million copies. Cotner conducts publishing workshops  at bookstores across the country  and has also made presentations at the Pacific Northwest Writers' Association Conference, the Pacific Northwest Booksellers Association Conference, and The Learning Annex in New York City, San Francisco, Los Angeles, and San Diego.

References

External links 
 Official Website

Living people
1950 births